Federico II may refer to:

 Frederick II, Holy Roman Emperor (1194–1250)
 Federico II da Montefeltro  (died c. 1370)
 Frederick II of Saluzzo (died in 1396)
 Federico II, Duke of Mantua (1500–1540)